Three Principles of the Equality or Triequism is a republican and nationalist political route established and promoted by South Korean independence activist Cho So-ang since 1918, and was an ideology included in the Constitution of the Provisional Government of the Republic of Korea.

Origin 
This ideology was influenced by Chinese politician Sun Yat-sen's Three Principles of the People, Natural rights in Western philosophy, and Christian egalitarianism.

Philosophy 
Three Principles of the Equality is the ideology of living an "equality" individuals and individuals, ethnicities and ethnicities, and countries and countries. Triquists value political, economic, and educational equality and support anti-imperialist and pacifist diplomacy.

See also 
 Christian democracy
 Korea Independence Party

References

Christian democracy
Christianity and political ideologies
Egalitarianism
Hongik Ingan
Korean nationalism
Progressivism in South Korea
Social democracy
Three Principles of the People